In geometry, a 65537-gon is a polygon with 65,537 (216 + 1) sides. The sum of the interior angles of any non–self-intersecting  is 11796300°.

Regular 65537-gon
The area of a regular  is (with )

A whole regular  is not visually discernible from a circle, and its perimeter differs from that of the circumscribed circle by about 15 parts per billion.

Construction
The regular 65537-gon (one with all sides equal and all angles equal) is of interest for being a constructible polygon: that is, it can be constructed using a compass and an unmarked straightedge. This is because 65,537 is a Fermat prime, being of the form 22n + 1 (in this case n = 4). 

Although it was known to Gauss by 1801 that the regular 65537-gon was constructible, the first explicit construction of a regular 65537-gon was given by Johann Gustav Hermes (1894). The construction is very complex; Hermes spent 10 years completing the 200-page manuscript. Another method involves the use of at most 1332 Carlyle circles, and the first stages of this method are pictured below. This method faces practical problems, as one of these Carlyle circles solves the quadratic equation x2 + x − 16384 = 0 (16384 being 214).

Symmetry
The regular 65537-gon has Dih65537 symmetry, order 131074. Since 65,537 is a prime number there is one subgroup with dihedral symmetry: Dih1, and 2 cyclic group symmetries: Z65537, and Z1.

65537-gram
A 65537-gram is a 65,537-sided star polygon.

See also

 Circle
 Equilateral triangle
 Pentagon
 Heptadecagon (17-sides)
 257-gon

References

Bibliography

Robert Dixon Mathographics. New York: Dover, p. 53, 1991.
Benjamin Bold, Famous Problems of Geometry and How to Solve Them New York: Dover, p. 70, 1982. 
H. S. M. Coxeter Introduction to Geometry, 2nd ed. New York: Wiley, 1969. Chapter 2, Regular polygons
Leonard Eugene Dickson Constructions with Ruler and Compasses; Regular Polygons Ch. 8 in Monographs on Topics of Modern Mathematics
Relevant to the Elementary Field (Ed. J. W. A. Young). New York: Dover, pp. 352–386, 1955.

External links
65537-gon mathematik-olympiaden.de (German), with images of the documentation HERMES; retrieved on July 9, 2018
Wikibooks 65573-Eck (German) Approximate construction of the first side in two main steps
65537-gon, exact construction for the 1st side, using the Quadratrix of Hippias and GeoGebra as additional aids, with brief description (German)

Constructible polygons
Polygons by the number of sides
Euclidean plane geometry
Carl Friedrich Gauss